Pony Post is a 1940 American Western film directed by Ray Taylor and written by Sherman L. Lowe. The film stars Johnny Mack Brown, Fuzzy Knight, Nell O'Day, Dorothy Short, Tom Chatterton and Stanley Blystone. The film was released on December 1, 1940, by Universal Pictures.

Plot

Cast        
Johnny Mack Brown as Cal Sheridan
Fuzzy Knight as Shorty
Nell O'Day as Norma Reeves
Dorothy Short as Alice Goodwin
Tom Chatterton as Maj. Goodwin
Stanley Blystone as Griff Atkins
Jack Rockwell as Mack Richards 
Ray Teal as Claud Richards
Kermit Maynard as Whitmore 
Lane Chandler as Ed Fairweather
Edmund Cobb as George Barber 
Lloyd Ingraham as Doctor Nesbet
Charles King as Hamilton

References

External links
 

1940 films
American Western (genre) films
1940 Western (genre) films
Universal Pictures films
Films directed by Ray Taylor
American black-and-white films
1940s English-language films
1940s American films